Dumre is a plateau and region in Central Albania, south of Elbasan. It has an area of  215 km2. Dumre has 85 lakes. Its main settlement is Belsh.

References

Albanian regions
Plateaus of Europe
Albanian ethnographic regions